Farzad Dibachi is a serial entrepreneur and business executive. He is the chief executive officer and co-founder of Silicon Valley startup Inxeption. Previously, Dibachi founded Noribachi, a custom LED lighting manufacturer specializing in industrial and commercial applications. In addition, he founded other Silicon Valley companies including Niku, later acquired by CA, Inc., and Diba, which he sold to Sun Microsystems. He is also the co-author of the book "Just Add Management: Seven Steps to Creating a Productive Workplace and Motivating Your Employees In Challenging Times." He authored "Diary of a Startup" for Upside (magazine) from 1996-1997.

Early life and education
Dibachi was born and raised in Iran until his family immigrated to the United States in 1979 after the Islamic revolution. Later, Dibachi attended San Jose State University in California, where he graduated with degrees in mechanical engineering and computer science at the age of 19. He would later pursue a master's degree in computer science at the University of Santa Clara, finishing all coursework except a final seminar class.

Career
Dibachi started his career at General Electric on an H1-B Visa, moving on to the Tandem Computers software engineering team in 1987 before joining Oracle Corporation in 1990 as a software engineer. Dibachi quickly rose through the ranks at Oracle, ascending to manager, vice president and senior vice president in three years. As the senior vice president of new media, he worked closely with Larry Ellison developing the company’s business strategy for a network computer. Dibachi left Oracle in 1995 to establish Diba, Inc., a microelectronics company and early designer of “information appliances” for the Web that he co-founded with his brother, Farid. The company, founded in January 1996, licensed its software and provided hardware designs to companies to manufacturer devices.

Dibachi filed paperwork to take Diba public in October 1996, which would have set a record for the fastest tech IPO, but the market went through a small crash. Microsoft reached out for an acquisition 15 months after Dibachi started the company, but Dibachi rejected the offer. He served as the company’s president and chief executive until it was sold in 1997 to Sun Microsystems for $75 million. Diba became the foundation for Sun's Consumer Technologies Group, which worked with consumer electronics companies to provide internet-ready, Java-enabled TVs, set-top boxes, satellite boxes and smartphones. Dibachi said more than 3,000 articles were written about Diba during that exciting time.

In 1998, Dibachi co-founded Niku Corporation with his wife, Rhonda. The technology company, an early player in Professional Service Applications (PSA), specialized in software for consulting companies, law firms and advertising agencies and was one of the first companies to provide its software as open source. In the first two years, it grew to 1,100 employees. Niku’s web division Iniku, an early cloud-based computing platform, built a marketplace for services to let contractors and large clients come together to negotiate proposals and run projects through the site.

The Dibachis took the company public in 2000 on NASDAQ with Goldman Sachs as the lead underwriter. Niku’s value tripled on its first day (leap day), with its initial price rising 183 percent for a $7 billion valuation. That same year, it was included on Forbes Magazine’s annual Forbes 500 List. Computer Associates, now known as CA, Inc., bought Niku in 2005 for $350 million.

After making Niku cash-flow positive and profitable, Dibachi temporarily retired in 2002 to devote his time to woodworking. He left Silicon Valley in October 2006 for Santa Fe, New Mexico, where he lived for almost 12 years. Of that time, Dibachi said: "I worked in Silicon Valley for a long time, and to be honest, I thought I was done with it — with starting companies, with the 24/7 pace, with the weird distance between 'virtual' products like software and real life, with venture capitalists — my list is long. Not long ago, I felt burned out and fed up. I was so fed up I moved to New Mexico and was pretty sure I wanted to live off the grid and build furniture for the rest of my life."

In 2006, Dibachi and his wife founded Noribachi, an LED lighting product manufacturer for commercial and industrial applications. They initially opened the company in Albuquerque, and then relocated its headquarters and manufacturing operations to Los Angeles in January 2012. The company quickly achieved 65% gross margins and was seeing $35 million in revenue in 2014. In 2015, Noribachi ranked 224 on the Inc. 5000 list. Dibachi was recognized as Entrepreneur's 2016 "Innovation" leader for his work with Noribachi technology on the Entrepreneur 360 List.

Inxeption
Speaking of his current startup, Inxeption, Dibachi has said: "The story of where Inxeption came from is as much about me leaving software development and coming back, and reconnecting with the 'real world' outside Silicon Valley as it is about a software start-up. But it's also about the potential to create a new kind of technology-enabled craft manufacturing ethic that provides more satisfaction for both the maker and the customer. We didn't start with new software tools and look for something to do with them; we started with a product, an object people buy and use, and we invented software to help us build and sell it in a better way that creates satisfied customers."

Dibachi started the Industrial Commerce company in 2017 with Mark Moore and Terry Garnett, all of whom had first worked together at Oracle. In those days, Moore was part of the Oracle Database Kernel Development team, which built the modern version of the Oracle database, and Garnett served on the Executive Management Committee. The new company incorporated in October of that year as an online marketplace bringing the Amazon experience to Industrial Commerce. Inxeption is based in Silicon Valley, with an operational headquarters in Louisville, Kentucky. It also has offices in Chicago and Atlanta.

In 2018, Dibachi announced that UPS (NYSE:UPS) Strategic Enterprise Fund has made an equity investment in Inxeption to create innovative new e-commerce solutions for B2B sellers and buyers. In 2019, Inxeption netted Series D funding from Coatue Management, and Series E funding from Schonfeld Strategic Advisors came in January 2022.

Personal life
Dibachi met his wife Rhonda while working at General Electric. They married in 1988 and have one son together. Dibachi and his wife are also founding donors of Pacific Community Ventures, a non-profit community-development organization.

References

Living people
San Jose State University alumni
American computer businesspeople
American technology chief executives
Businesspeople from Los Angeles
Year of birth missing (living people)
Iranian emigrants to the United States
Place of birth missing (living people)